The Norfolk thrush (Turdus poliocephalus poliocephalus), also known as the grey-headed blackbird or guava bird, was a bird in the thrush family endemic to Norfolk Island, an Australian territory in the Tasman Sea.  It is the extinct nominate subspecies of the island thrush (Turdus poliocephalus).

Description
 
The Norfolk thrush was mainly dark brown in colour, with a pale grey-brown head and upper breast. It was about 21 cm in length, with a wingspan of 34 cm and a weight of 55 g. It had a yellow bill, orbital ring and legs. Males and females were similar in size and appearance.

Habitat
The Norfolk thrush used to be common in forest and was often seen in gardens adjacent to rainforest remnants.

Behaviour

Breeding
The subspecies nested in trees, including the introduced lemon tree. The clutch size was 2–4.

Feeding
The Norfolk thrush foraged mainly on the ground, in leaf litter, for small invertebrates, seeds and fallen fruit.

Status and conservation
The subspecies became extinct around the late 1970s, with the last confirmed record in 1975. The cause of its extinction is attributed to a combination of clearing of native vegetation and predation by rats and feral cats. Additional factors were competition with introduced song thrushes and common blackbirds, as well as by interbreeding with the latter species producing sterile offspring.

Notes

References
 Higgins, P.J.; Peter, J.M.; & Cowling, S.J. (eds). 2006. Handbook of Australian, New Zealand and Antarctic Birds. Volume 7: Boatbill to Starlings. Oxford University Press: Melbourne. 
 Natural History Museum image reference 12226

Extinct birds of Norfolk Island
Turdus
Bird extinctions since 1500
Birds described in 1801